Scott Jeffery Kellar (born December 31, 1963) is a former American football nose tackle who played two seasons with the Indianapolis Colts of the National Football League (NFL). He was drafted by the Colts in the fifth round of the 1986 NFL Draft. He played college football at Northern Illinois University and attended Lake Park High School in Roselle, Illinois. Kellar was also a member of the Green Bay Packers, Minnesota Vikings and Ottawa Rough Riders.

Early years
Kellar participated in high school football and track at Lake Park High School. He was the league discus record-holder and a state meet finalist in shot put.

College career
Kellar played for the Northern Illinois from 1982 to 1985. He recorded 298 career tackles. He earned Huskies' defensive MVP, First-team All-MAC and Associated Press Honorable Mention All-America honors in 1984. Kellar was named Northern Illinois tri-captain and garnered Second-team All-MAC accolades his senior year in 1985. He received the Broderick-Andres Award as outstanding Northern Illinois male student-athlete for the 1985-86 school year. He was also a two-time winner of the NIU Abe Rosenbloom Lineman Award in 1984 and 1985. Kellar was named to the All-Time Huskie Stadium Team in 1995 and the Huskies' All-Century Team in 1999. He was inducted into the Northern Illinois University Athletics Hall of Fame in 1993.

Professional career
Kellar was selected by the Indianapolis Colts of the NFL with the 117th pick in the 1986 NFL Draft and signed with the team on July 19, 1986. He played in fourteen games, starting eight, for the Colts during the 1986 season. He played in three games, starting two, for the team in 1987 before suffering a knee injury. Kellar was released by the Colts on August 23, 1988. He spent some of the 1989 off-season with the NFL's Green Bay Packers. He was released by the Packers on August 3, 1989. Kellar also spent time with the Minnesota Vikings of the NFL during the 1989 off-season. He was also a member of the Ottawa Rough Riders of the Canadian Football League in 1989. He then retired from football.

Coaching career
Kellar was named defensive line coach at the College of DuPage in 1990 and spent ten years there. He was the defensive line coach at Western Kentucky University in 1992. He was named strength and conditioning coach at Bowling Green State University in 2000. Kellar became strength and conditioning coach at the University of Houston in 2001.

Personal life
Kellar's brother Mark also played football at Northern Illinois University and in the National Football League.

References

External links
Just Sports Stats

Living people
1963 births
Sportspeople from Elgin, Illinois
Players of American football from Illinois
American football defensive tackles
Northern Illinois Huskies football players
Indianapolis Colts players
Green Bay Packers players
Minnesota Vikings players
National Football League replacement players
American players of Canadian football
Canadian football defensive linemen
Ottawa Rough Riders players
Coaches of American football from Illinois
Western Kentucky Hilltoppers football coaches
Bowling Green Falcons football coaches
Houston Cougars football coaches